Nadaun Assembly constituency is one of the 68 assembly constituencies of Himachal Pradesh a state of northern India. It is also part of Hamirpur, Himachal Pradesh Lok Sabha constituency.

Members of Legislative Assembly

Election results

2022 

-->

2017

See also
 Nadaun
 Hamirpur district, Himachal Pradesh
 Hamirpur, Himachal Pradesh Lok Sabha constituency

References

External links
 

Hamirpur district, Himachal Pradesh
Assembly constituencies of Himachal Pradesh